Manaratsandry is a rural municipality in Madagascar. It belongs to the district of Marovoay, which is a part of Boeny Region. The population of the commune was estimated to be approximately 20,000 in 2001 commune census.

Geography
It is situated on the left bank of the Betsiboka River at 51 km from Marovoay.

Manaratsandry has a riverine harbour. Primary and junior level secondary education are available in town. The majority 80% of the population of the commune are farmers, while an additional 16% receives their livelihood from raising livestock. The most important crop is rice, while other important products are peanuts and maize.  Industry and services provide both employment for 1% of the population. Additionally fishing employs 2% of the population.

References  

Populated places in Boeny